Bajwara is an old historic town situated in Hoshiarpur District. It is birthplace of Mata Sundri, second wife of Guru Gobind Singh. This is also the birthplace of Sher Shah Suri, Todar Mal from the Jerath family, and Mahatama Hansraj.

History
This town was founded by Naru Rajputs. This town was settled sometime in the late 15th century by Pashtun Muslims from the Sulaiman Mountains. From this town, the Pathans used to keep an eye on the local Hindu Hill Rulers in case they tried to rebel against Lodi rule. Bahlul Lodi also used to use this town as a fortress while going on his expeditions. The Rajput ruler Raja Sansar Chand built a fort here known as Bajwara Fort sometime in the 15th century during Mughal rule. This place got developed till the 18th century before it came into the hands of Sansi Sikh ruler Maharaja Ranjit Singh. Bajwara was a popular trading centre between Bukhra and Delhi. Bajwara consisted of 22 Bassi villages.

References

Cities and towns in Hoshiarpur district